Charles Lynagh was an Irish clergyman  who served  as  Bishop of Achonry from 1803 until his death on 27 April 1808.

He died at Westport, County Mayo and is buried at Aughagower in the same county.

References

1747 births
1808 deaths
19th-century Roman Catholic bishops in Ireland
Roman Catholic bishops of Achonry